Watchareeya Nuanjam (born July 22, 1996) is a Thai indoor volleyball player. She is a current member of the Thailand women's national volleyball team.

Club
  Supreme Chonburi-E.tech (2011–present)

Awards

Club 
 2013 Thai–Denmark Super League – Runner-up, with Supreme Chonburi
 2016–17 Thailand League –  Champion, with Supreme Chonburi
 2017 Thai–Denmark Super League –  Champion, with Supreme Chonburi
 2017 Asian Club Championship –  Champion, with Supreme Chonburi
 2017–18 Thailand League –  Champion, with Supreme Chonburi
 2018 Thai–Denmark Super League –  Champion, with Supreme Chonburi
 2018 Asian Club Championship –  Champion, with Supreme Chonburi
 2018–19 Thailand League –  Runner-up, with Supreme Chonburi
 2019 Thai–Denmark Super League –  Champion, with Supreme Chonburi
 2019 Asian Club Championship –  Runner-up, with Supreme Chonburi
 2019–20 Thailand League –  Champion, with Supreme Chonburi

References 

1996 births
Living people
Watchareeya Nuanjam
Watchareeya Nuanjam
Watchareeya Nuanjam
Middle blockers
Watchareeya Nuanjam
Watchareeya Nuanjam
Watchareeya Nuanjam